Louis Pinkerton is a North Dakota Democratic-NPL Party politician who represented the 5th district in the North Dakota House of Representatives from 2007–2011.

Pinkerton was elected in 2006 finishing 1st out of 4 candidates in district 5. In 2010, Pinkerton lost re-election finishing 3rd out of 4 candidates in district 5.

In 2012, Pinkerton will run for house in District 40 with Sue Olafson. Their opponents will be Matthew Klein and Robert Frantsvog.

References

External links
North Dakota Legislative Assembly - Representative Louis Pinkerton official ND Senate website
Project Vote Smart - Representative Louis Pinkerton (ND) profile
Follow the Money - Louis Pinkerton
2006 campaign contributions
North Dakota Democratic-NPL Party - Representative Louis Pinkerton profile

Members of the North Dakota House of Representatives
Living people
Year of birth missing (living people)